The following lists events that happened during 1971 in Singapore.

Incumbents
President: Yeoh Ghim Seng (Acting) (23 November 1970 to 2 January), Benjamin Henry Sheares (starting 2 January)
Prime Minister: Lee Kuan Yew

Events

January
 1 January – The Monetary Authority of Singapore was established to regulate the financial sector and as Singapore's central bank.
 2 January – Dr Benjamin Henry Sheares becomes the second President of Singapore.
 3 January – Jurong Bird Park opens to the public.
 14–22 January - Singapore hosts the 18th Conference of the Commonwealth Heads of Government Meeting.
 29 January – The Preservation of Monuments Board was established to identify and safeguard buildings of great historical value and recommend as national monuments.

February
 1 February – The National Sports Promotion Board is formed to promote and develop sports in Singapore.

March
 15 March – The Staff Training Institute (now the Civil Service College) is established to train civil servants.

April
 15–16 April - Singapore, United Kingdom, Malaysia, Australia and New Zealand sign the Five Power Defence Arrangements. The agreement comes into effect on 1 November the same year.
 23 April -
The Shangri-La Hotel Singapore is opened.
The first Concept Plan is unveiled, which proposes a 'Ring Plan'.

July
 14 July – The Jurong Drive-in Cinema is opened as Singapore's first and only open-air drive-in cinema. The cinema operated for 15 years until its closure on 30 September 1985.
 30 July – Singapore's first sex reassignment surgery is performed on a 24-year-old who becomes a woman after the surgery, led by Dr S. S. Ratnam. The surgery is declared a success.

October
 23 October – The Sentosa Satellite Earth Station is officially launched, making it Singapore's first Satellite Earth Station.
 31 October – The last British military forces withdraws from Singapore.

November
 2 November – The Central Narcotics Bureau is set up to tackle the problem of drugs in Singapore.
 7 November – The first Tree Planting Day is launched by Dr Goh Keng Swee in Mount Faber.

December
 1 December – The Singapore Traction Company ceases operations.
 2 December – The Clean Air Act is passed to deal with pollution caused by early industrialisation.
 29 December – The Gold Bars Triple Murders saw a gold merchant and his two employees robbed and killed by a group of 10 men. Seven of the 10 men were sentenced to death for the crime; the remaining three were indefinitely detained for lengthy periods before their release.

Date unknown
 Tower 1 of Mandarin Orchard Singapore is opened.

Births
 27 January - Fann Wong - Actress.
 30 January - Bryan Wong - Actor
 23 July - Christopher Lee - Malaysia-born Singaporean actor.
 Daren Shiau - Writer, lawyer, environmental activist.
 Selena Tan - Producer, director, writer and actress.

References

 
Singapore
Years in Singapore